Carlos André may refer to:

 Carlos André (footballer, born 1971), Portuguese football player and coach
 Carlos André (footballer, born 1987), Brazilian football player
 Carlos André (footballer, born 1982), Portuguese football left winger